The 2014–15 Khuzestan Premier League season was the 15th season of the Khuzestan Premier League which took place from September 28, 2015 to March 19, 2015 with 14 teams competing from the province of Khuzestan. Teams played home and away with one another each playing 26 matches. Esteghlal Shushtar finished the season on top of the standings and was promoted to division 3 of the Iranian football system. Meanwhile, finishing in last place, Kargar Shadegan will be relegated to the Khuzestan Division 1 league.

Teams 

Source:

Final Standings

Results

See also 

 2014–15 Azadegan League
 2014–15 League 2
 2014–15 League 3
 2014–15 Hazfi Cup
 2014 Iranian Super Cup

References 

Khuzestan Premier League
1
Iran